Sonnets for an Old Century is an anthology styled play published in 2000 and written by José Rivera. This play contains a series of twenty-eight different sonnets in which the characters express what appears to be their last words and thoughts that will go out to the universe.

Characters
Here is a list of characters in the play in order of appearance. The playwright expresses that "The many people who appear in the space are from various parts of the United States. There are Latinos, blacks, Asians, whites. There are gays and straights, children and old people. All strangers to each other."  It is said that all of the characters in the play are named after real life actors that José Rivera was a fan of.

Wendy Johnson: This character introduces the play not just to the audience, but also to the rest of the characters in the space. It is specified that Wendy is addressing all of the people in the room. She explains the instructions that they have to follow, how it is all going to work out. The first lines of the play being "You stand here and make your statement. That's it." She does not explain where they are, why they are there and if they are dead. It is easy to assume that they might be, but the playwright does not specify. It is thought as if they are dead, considering Wendy's last words are: "It's the last and only time you have to give your side of the story, as far as I know."

Javi Mulero:

Camilia Sanes: Camilia reminisces about her mother reading to her as a child and the comfort it brought her.

Anne O’Sullivan: Anne recites some life lessons she learned in her time on Earth.

Dawnn Lewis: Dawn started her evening in a screening in Santa Monica, California. While she's there, there seems to be no sight of a TV as to where to project the film. She then chooses to leave the event and drive back to her home, in Pasadena, on the Interstate 10. On her way there, she encounters a black large mass of sorts, in the sky. Not really knowing what it is she comes to the assumption that it is a tornado. She then realizes that there are more than a couple of these "black large" masses that she thought were tornados. Until she realizes that it is smoke! The city appears to be on fire and it's only burning on what is known as the "black" part of town. She begins to have anxiety, left over, from when the Watts riots were occurring in 1965. Little does she know she was driving by the Rodney King riots, or what is known as the 1992 Los Angeles riots.

Rick Coca: Rick remembers the way his mother taught him to kill chickens and pigs as a child in Nicaragua. As an adult, Rick is parked outside a house in a wealthy, white neighborhood waiting for his girlfriend to get done with her job babysitting, and a police car shows up behind him. Rick observes that the officer is looking at him the way he used to look at the pigs he was about to kill as a child, as if he was bringing justice from a higher power.

Maricela Ochoa:

Michi Barall:

John Ortiz: John recounts being on a beach in Puerto Rico at sunset with his lover, Therese, eating a mango, listening to a little girl sing along to a man playing the mandolin. The moment is one of beauty and peace, yet John examines why he is not happy there. He realizes that his ambition was the reason why, commanding him to "leave paradise and kill [himself] with work twenty-four hours a day."

Esther Scott: A USA citizen who always has wanted to be the president, and so she tried to run for president. She struggled to get enough signatures in order for her to be eligible to be placed on the ballot in Michigan. Throughout most of her sonnet she expresses the knowledge she has about real life statistics and facts from 1994, 1992, 1990 and even 1989 that provided the issues she saw in The United States. These are the reasons as to why she wants to become president, in order to address this issues and makes the country better. It is important to note that all of the information she addresses about the country are accurate and factual.  Esther also references the 1915 "The Birth of a Nation" film in one of her lines.

Sam Wellington:

Robert Montano:

Vanessa Marquez: Was a patient at the Northridge Hospital in California. She claims that she caused the 1994 Northridge earthquake to occur while she was lying on her bed in the hospital. Vanessa had previously been in a car accident months ago on the Interstate 10 and had been paralyzed from her waist down. She was not improving. Out of frustration, on the night of the earthquake, she tried with all her might to move her legs, when she finally did, at that same instant the ground shook. "I made the whole earth shake with my tiny legs!" She was both excited to finally move her legs and yet at the same time terrified that she could do so much destruction with just the movement of her little legs.

Ana Ortiz: Ana apologizes to a man she saw seven years ago in the Bronx being brutally beaten by two men. Instead of calling anyone or trying to help, Ana fled the scene and was consumed with guilt for the rest of her life.

Carlo Alban:

John Vargas: John reflects on how he was madly in love with his wife's sister but was doomed never to gain her affection. He berates himself for feeling this way, calling himself "a parody of a man."

Svetlana Efremova:

Jessica Hecht:

Geno Silva:

Antionette Abbamonte:

Karenjune Sanchez:

Yusef Bulos:

Felicity Jones:

Doris Defarnecio: Appears to be a young girl from Mexico whose father is a farmhand. They travel quite a lot in their truck and have, in the past, crossed several borders, legally of course. This sonnet seems to be about one evening gone terribly wrong for the Defarnecio family. One night the truck was filled with more than just Mama, Papa and herself, which is unusual. She explains how her Papa stopped for other people that night, not knowing why considering that "he never does that." They were going north, meaning they could have been South enough to be traveling from the border of Mexico to somewhere in California. After her Papa picked up what were complete strangers to Doris, the police began to follow them, Papa did not stop. In fact he kept driving faster and faster, through shat she felt to be a  storm, from how fast they were going and how loud the engine was. Until, all of a sudden he lost control in a U-turn. Concluding with both her Mama and Papa passing away that evening. "When the storm ended, my Mama and Papa were gone. The storm had turned my family into rain." One of the explanations as to why Papa did not stop for the police could be that the "other people" might of potentially been illegal immigrants and Papa was helping them travel.

Kevin Jackson:

X:

Mark Ferreira:

Cordelia Gonzalez:

Kristine Nielsen:

Alene Dawson:

Rene Rivera:

Kristen Van Horne:

Setting
The location for this play in particular is no set place, but it seems to like being in purgatory. For the most part it is up to interpretation, imagination and choice as to where the location of this play is. Where the play is set will not necessarily change the meaning of the text or the story the character is displaying. Although, most of these characters do seem to have some sort of connection with different places in California, specifically, but the characters don't necessarily have to originate from there or be there at the time they are sharing their sonnet. The playwright specifies that "The space could be a tunnel, a cave, a warehouse, an airplane hangar, catacombs, or a seedy office building with ugly fluorescent lighting—but it’s a large space.”

Style
The Romantic style of this play makes it almost seem like these characters are reading their own personal eulogies. It is not the typical through line of a play  a reader would expect. It does not necessarily have a specific beginning, middle and end. It is written and published as an anthology. There is in fact something beautiful about this writing that displays how the style can, in a way, "make it old" and "make it new," because of the romantic element of having their stories be told in a form of sonnets. A sonnet is considered a poem. Traditionally, sonnets are meant to be a stanza of fourteen lines, that are written in iambic pentameter. Also, originally "the traditional subject of the sonnet has primarily been Love." William Shakespeare, is the first and most well known writer for classical sonnets. Since Shakespeare's era it is known that politicians and artists do not necessarily always see the world through the same lens. This has provided some conflict in the past. Although, through Shakespeare's incorporation of romanticism in his texts it supplied a path in which entrepreneurs and artists could share and adapt similar points of view.

Common Themes
There are certain events, places and/or people that are mentioned in more than one sonnet. For instance both the character's Vanessa Marquez and Dawnn Lewis drove by the Interstate 10 in the story they were telling. Both Maricela Ochoa and Michi Barall choose to speak about space and the galaxy. Kristen Van Horne and Jessica Hecht both mention Lightnin' Hopkins. Javi Mulero and Esther Scott both talk about the president. Many characters are of Latin American origin. There are several aspects that are mentioned more than once in different sonnets, it doesn't not mean these characters are linked in any way. It's simply something to notice and take note of.

History
All sonnets are in fact completely different and are in no way necessarily related to each other. Still taking into consideration that within the common aspects/themes that some of the sonnets have with each other. There is specific factual history and real life events/circumstances mentioned and referenced within them. This does not conclude in that these sonnets themselves are indeed real stories told by people, simply that some of the facts and/or events are in fact nonfictional. For instance, the 1992 Los Angeles riots was a community uproar and response on the handling of Rodney King's trial, after the disturbing act of being incredibly affected by police brutality. The 1994 Northridge earthquake occurred on the early morning of January 17, around 4:30:55AM. The location that was affected was about 1 mile south-southwest of the Northridge area and about 20 miles west-northwest of Los Angeles. This earthquake was a strong magnitude of MW6.7, which is estimated to only occur around 100 times a year. It is expected to cause incredible amounts of damage surrounding populated areas. The 1915 silent epic drama The Birth of a Nation was a pro-Ku Klux Klan film, initially released as The Clansman. This film premiered as so in what was called Clune's Auditorium, previously known as Hazard's Pavilion prior to its demolition and destruction in 1906. It is an extremely controversial film regarding its valiant and righteous portrayal of the KKK. White males used black face while being depicted as hostile and sexually aggressive towards specifically white women. The famous American musician Lightnin' Hopkins,1912-1982, is mentioned a couple of times throughout the sonnets. He was one of the greatest country blues singers of all time and, as the New York Times expresses in his obituary, "perhaps the greatest single influence on rock guitar players." Continuing with a topic, that is quickly touched on, that being illegal immigration. Throughout 1910-1930 the number of immigrants tripled in numbers, from 200,000 to 600,000. This number has certainly grown throughout the years. For many of these immigrants their journey into moving to The United States was more than just one trip. Keeping in mind that the distance between Mexico and California was so minimal people would attempt to go back and forth in order to obtain most if not all of their possessions. This has been a method used by immigrants for many decades. Perhaps this is what characters like Doris Defarnecio were experiencing when the disturbing death of her Papa and Mama occurred.

José Rivera (playwright)
He is a screenwriter and playwright born on March 24, in the Santurce district in San Juan, Puerto Rico in 1955. He has written and published around thirty three different plays in his lifetime. Highlighting some of his well-known and successful works named Marisol and References to Salvador Dalí Make Me Hot. Rivera is also known to have studied screenwriting with the great Gabriel García Marquez. There are some similarities and influence regarding Rivera's Sonnets for an Old Century and Edgar Lee Masters a Spoon River Anthology. "Masters felt the challenge of combining free verse, epitaph, realism, and cynicism to write Spoon River Anthology, a collection of monologues from the dead in an Illinois graveyard." Similar to Rivera's style for this particular play, both anthologies draw an incredibly thin line between what is life and afterlife.

Performances
A cast from Interlochen Center for the Arts performed in the summer of 2014, at the Edinburgh Festival Fringe.

References

2000 plays
Plays by José Rivera